Slagle may refer to:

Places in the United States
Slagle, Louisiana
Slagle, Missouri
Slagle, West Virginia
Slagle Creek (disambiguation)
Slagle Ridge
Slagle Township, Michigan

People with the surname Slagle
Christian W. Slagle
Dutch Slagle
Eleanor Clarke Slagle
Gene Slagle
Jimmy Slagle
John Slagle
Roger Slagle
Steve Slagle
Tim Slagle
Walt Slagle

See also